Peeping Tom were an American rock band led by Mike Patton. To date, they have released one eponymous album and two singles on Ipecac Recordings. The band has featured a wide variety of well-known artists such as Amon Tobin, Massive Attack, Norah Jones and Kool Keith.

Peeping Tom has been called Patton's most mainstream accessible work since his days with Faith No More.

History 

Work began on Peeping Tom in 2000, but the album was delayed six years due to Patton's recording or touring work with Fantômas, Tomahawk, Lovage, General Patton vs. The X-Ecutioners, Kaada/Patton. Additionally, around this time, he collaborated with Björk on her album medúlla, scored two feature films, acted in Firecracker and did video game voice work in The Darkness. Finally, in 2006, the self-titled debut album, Peeping Tom was released through Patton's own label, Ipecac Recordings.

The entire album was written by Patton with a wishlist of collaborators he had in mind and hoped would contribute to the finished tracks. The album featured performances by artists such as Norah Jones ("Sucker"), Kool Keith ("Getaway") and Massive Attack ("Kill the DJ"), although almost none of the featured artists recorded their parts with Patton there. "Instead of swapping spit and underwear, we were swapping files," Patton explained. He said that "plenty of people on the record are still complete strangers to [him]."

The first single from the album was Mojo. It was accompanied by a music video featuring appearances by Danny DeVito, Mark Hoppus of Blink-182, Rachel Hunter and song performers Dan the Automator and Rahzel. The video was created by music video director Matt McDermitt. The band made its worldwide live debut on the May 26, 2006 episode of Late Night with Conan O'Brien.

Musical style and influences

Peeping Tom's music style encompasses rock, heavy metal, experimental pop, pop, trip hop, alternative hip hop, underground hip hop and hip hop.

Collaborators
 Rahzel
 Dan the Automator
 Kool Keith
 Doseone
 Norah Jones
 Bebel Gilberto
 Massive Attack
 Dub Trio
 Jel
 Odd Nosdam
 Amon Tobin
 Kid Koala
 Mike Relm
 Imani Coppola
 Butterscotch
 Rob Swift
 DJ Z-Trip
 DJ Quest
 DJ D-Sharp

Discography

Studio albums

Singles

Music videos
 2006 – "Mojo"

References

External links

[ Allmusic: Biography]
Discussion of Peeping Tom on Ipecac Recordings site
Official MySpace
HoboTrashcan's One on One with Mike Patton
Peeping Tom Discography

Alternative hip hop groups
American hip hop groups
American pop music groups
American rock music groups
Anticon
Experimental pop groups
Ipecac Recordings artists
Trip hop groups